Eusébio Amaro Lopes Guimarães, known as Eusébio (born 26 August 1966) is a former Portuguese football player.

He played 8 seasons and 232 games in the Primeira Liga for Tirsense, Beira-Mar and Braga.

Club career
He made his Primeira Liga debut for Tirsense on 20 August 1989 in a game against Boavista.

Honours
Beira-Mar
Taça de Portugal: 1998–99

References

External links
 

1966 births
People from Santo Tirso
Living people
Portuguese footballers
F.C. Tirsense players
Liga Portugal 2 players
Primeira Liga players
S.C. Braga players
S.C. Beira-Mar players
S.C. Freamunde players
A.D. Ovarense players
Association football midfielders
Sportspeople from Porto District